A list of Spanish-produced and co-produced feature films released in Spain in 2009. When applicable, the domestic theatrical release date is favoured.

Films

Box office 
The ten highest-grossing Spanish films in 2009, by domestic box office gross revenue, are as follows:

See also 
 24th Goya Awards
 List of 2009 box office number-one films in Spain

References 
Informational notes

Citations

External links
 Spanish films of 2009 at the Internet Movie Database

2009
Lists of 2009 films by country or language
Films